Emanuele Calaiò (born 8 January 1982) is a former Italian footballer who played as a striker.

Club career
Calaiò started his football career at Torino making his league debut against Reggina on 6 January 2000, he scored a goal for Torino three minutes into his debut. He made 20 league appearances in total for Torino.

In January 2002 Calaiò was exchanged with Alessandro Cibocchi of Ternana with inflated price tag to create a paper profit for both clubs (for which Ternana was fined in 2010, 8 years later) and then a short spell with Messina followed. In January 2003, he was loaned by Pescara and turned permanently in June 2004. He also returned to Torino Calcio in 2003 in exchange with Cibocchi again.

With Pescara, Calaiò solidified himself as an impressive striker, the club won promotion back into Serie B in 2003, with Calaiò scoring 20 times in his second season. In the third at Serie B, he scored 6 in the first half of the season.

Napoli
In January 2005, S.S.C. Napoli in Serie C1 signed him for €2.85 million, he scored just 6 in the first season, but in the second he scored 18, won the champion and promotion back to Serie B with club. He scored 14 in his third season with Napoli, won promotion back to Serie A. With the arrival of Marcelo Zalayeta and Ezequiel Lavezzi, he had limited chances to play.

Siena
In July 2008, Calaiò joined fellow Serie A team, Siena in a co-ownership bid, for €2.3 million. in June 2009 Siena signed him outright for €1.25 million (which made Napoli register a financial loss of €1.05 million). He followed Siena, relegated to Serie B in 2010 and finished as the runner-up and promoted back to top division. On 10 June 2011, he signed a new three-year contract. He was one of the two starting strikers along with Mattia Destro in 2011–12 Serie A season, scoring 11 goals in 25 league matches until he broke his leg in March 2012.

Return to Napoli
On 11 January 2013, his transfer to former team Napoli was officially announced. He arrived on-loan with the option to make the switch permanent if Napoli qualified for the Champions League during the 2013 season.

Catania
On 11 July 2014, his transfer to Catania was officially announced. He signed a two-year contract with an option for a third.

Spezia
On 3 August 2015, Calaiò was signed by Spezia.

Parma
On 4 August 2016, Calaiò was sold to Parma. On 23 July 2018, he was handed a two-year ban and a €20,000 fine, following text messages "eliciting a reduced effort" from two players of Spezia during the 2017–18 Serie B, a match Parma won 2–0 to secure promotion to 2018–19 Serie A. On 9 August, Calaiò's ban was reduced, expiring on 31 December 2018, however the fine was increased to €30,000.

Salernitana
On 31 January 2019, Calaiò signed to Salernitana. On 17 September 2019 he announced his retirement from playing.

International career
Calaiò capped for both Italy U21 and Serie B U21 selection which played the latter for the match 3–2 won Belgium U21 on 30 March 2004. He also received the Serie B U21 call-up for the match against Legnano.

He also call-up to 2000 UEFA European Under-18 Football Championship qualification and played in qualifying match in 2001 edition. Calaiò capped once for U17 team, at that time the feeder team of U18. (now called Italy national under-18 football team)

Style of play
A left–footed striker, Calaiò was mainly known for his heading, ability in the air, and eye for goal; he was also an accurate penalty taker.

Personal life
Calaiò is married to Federica, sister of Nicola Mora's wife. Both players played for Torino during the 2000–01 season and Napoli in 2004–05.

Career statistics
''As of 12 September 2009

1Include 2 matches at promotion playoffs
2Include 3 matches at promotion playoffs

Honours
Torino
Serie B: 2000–01

Napoli
Serie C1: 2005–06
Serie B: 2006–07

References

External links
 FIGC National Team Archive 
 

Italian footballers
Italy under-21 international footballers
Italy youth international footballers
Torino F.C. players
Ternana Calcio players
A.C.R. Messina players
Delfino Pescara 1936 players
S.S.C. Napoli players
A.C.N. Siena 1904 players
Genoa C.F.C. players
Catania S.S.D. players
Spezia Calcio players
Parma Calcio 1913 players
U.S. Salernitana 1919 players
Association football forwards
Serie A players
Serie B players
Serie C players
Footballers from Palermo
1982 births
Living people
Mediterranean Games silver medalists for Italy
Mediterranean Games medalists in football
Competitors at the 2001 Mediterranean Games